Lewis Irving (born 10 November 1995) is a Canadian freestyle skier who competes internationally in the aerials discipline.

Career
He represented Canada at the 2018 Winter Olympics.

On January 24, 2022, Lewis was named to Canada's 2022 Olympic team. At the games, Irving was a part of Canada's bronze medal winning mixed aerials team.

References

External links 
 
 

1995 births
Living people
Anglophone Quebec people
Canadian male freestyle skiers
Olympic freestyle skiers of Canada
Freestyle skiers at the 2018 Winter Olympics
Freestyle skiers at the 2022 Winter Olympics
Skiers from Quebec City
Medalists at the 2022 Winter Olympics
Olympic bronze medalists for Canada
Olympic medalists in freestyle skiing